South Park High School (SPHS) is a public high school in South Park Township, Allegheny County, Pennsylvania, United States. It is part of the South Park School District.

References

External links 
 

Schools in Allegheny County, Pennsylvania
Public high schools in Pennsylvania